"Addams Groove" is a single performed by hip-hop artist Hammer that was released as the theme song to the 1991 film The Addams Family. It was the second single from his 1991 album, Too Legit to Quit, included in the track list for the cassette version of the album but not the CD. The song was his fifth and last top-10 hit in the United States and was the recipient of the Golden Raspberry Award for Worst Original Song at the 12th Golden Raspberry Awards in 1991.

The song was also parodied by Italian comedy music duo Giovanni Alamia and Tony Sperandeo with the title of "Rap Ghiaccio" and was taken from their album of the same year of the release of the song "Brutti, sporchi e monelli".

Music video
A music video was produced to promote the single. It featured Hammer and several of his dancers performing in their unique style around the Addams mansion as well as most of the cast of the film. The video opens with Hammer pleading with Wednesday (Christina Ricci) and Pugsley (Jimmy Workman) to refrain from chopping his head off with a guillotine. It concludes with several scenes taking place in the Addamses' backyard cemetery, including Thing crawling up and down a Hammer dancer and Gomez (Raúl Juliá) dueling in a sword-fight with Hammer over Morticia (Anjelica Huston).

The music video was played prior to the beginning of the film during its theatrical release. The video also features a 13-year old Jimmy Rollins as an extra.

Track listing
CD single
 "Addams Groove" (LP Version) – 3:58
 "Addams Groove" (Instrumental) – 3:55
 "2 Legit 2 Quit" – 5:02

Japan Mini CD single
 "Addams Groove" – 3:58
 "Addams Groove" (Instrumental) – 3:55

UK 7" vinyl single
 A. "Addams Groove" (L.P. Mix) – 3:58
 B. "Street Soldiers" (Saxapella Reprise) – 5:02

UK 12" vinyl single
 "Addams Groove" (L.P. Mix) – 3:58
 "Addams Groove" (Instrumental) – 3:55
 "Street Soldiers" (Saxapella Reprise) – 5:02
 "2 Legit 2 Quit" (Edit) – 4:00

Charts

Weekly charts

Year-end charts

Certifications

References

1991 songs
1991 singles
The Addams Family music
Songs written by MC Hammer
MC Hammer songs
Capitol Records singles
Songs written for films
Songs with music by Vic Mizzy